Dutch cask is a UK unit of weight for butter and cheese.

Definition 

Conversion 
1 Dutch cask ≡ 32/21 Tub

1 Dutch cask ≡ 112 pounds(avdp.)

1 Dutch cask ≡ 50.80234544 kg

References

Cooking weights and measures
Units of mass